Zaliznychne is an urban-type settlement in Polohy Raion of Zaporizhzhia Oblast in Ukraine. Zaliznychne belongs to Huliaipole urban hromada, one of the hromadas of Ukraine. Population: 

Until 18 July 2020, Zaliznychne belonged to Huliaipole Raion. The raion was abolished in July 2020 as part of the administrative reform of Ukraine, which reduced the number of raions of Zaporizhzhia Oblast to five. The area of Huliaipole Raion was merged into Polohy Raion.

The settlement was established in 1937 as XX-richia Zhovtnia around Huliapole train station that existed since 1898. In 1961 it was renamed as Zaliznychne.

Economy

Transportation

References

Urban-type settlements in Polohy Raion
Populated places established in 1937
1937 establishments in the Soviet Union